ANTHM is a rapper from Manhattan, NY. Of Ethiopian descent, ANTHM was born in Russia, but spent parts of his childhood in Germany and Dallas, Texas. Before pursuing a rap career, ANTHM attended Duke University, then went on to become a trader at the Wall Street firm Citigroup.

Career
While at Duke, ANTHM wrote poetry and spoken word, ultimately finding his passion with rapping. After graduating from Duke, while working in Manhattan, ANTHM linked up with David Gross, aka "DG", and formed the independent label, AMG.

On April 10, 2012, ANTHM released his mixtape 'When We Were Kings'., which he followed up on June 14, 2012 with his 'Joy & Pain' EP, which featured more widely recognized artists Blu and Freddie Gibbs. Both projects were well received, with 'Joy & Pain' receiving a variety of internet attention, including Stacks Magazine calling it 'astoundingly innovative, and creatively conflicted'.  ANTHM was also named one of 'The 10 Best kept Secrets At SXSW 2012' by The Well Versed.

In the spring of 2013, ANTHM linked back up with Blu to create the EP 'Handful of Dust', released March 4, 2013. The EP was again well-received, and earned a rating of 4/5 on HipHopdx.com, stating that 'ANTHM doesn't just hold his own [on Blu's production] he clearly shines on Handful of Dust.'

ANTHM quickly followed up "A Handful of Dust" with the release of "The Fire Next Time" and is currently working on an EP slated to be released this fall entitled "Everywhere & Nowhere".  Additionally, he has released a variety of freestyles and a number of music videos on YouTube.

Discography

EPs
 Joy & Pain (2012)
 Handful of Dust (2013) (prod. by Blu)
 The Fire Next Time (2013)

Mixtapes
 Manhattan Music, Vol. 1 (2011)
 When We Were Kings (2012)

References

American hip hop musicians
Living people
Rappers from Manhattan
21st-century American rappers
Year of birth missing (living people)